Never Surrender may refer to:

 Never Surrender (film), a 2009 film about mixed martial arts
 Never Surrender (novel), a 2004 novel by Michael Dobbs
 Never Surrender: A Galaxy Quest Documentary (film), a 2019 documentary about the film Galaxy Quest
 Never Surrender, an American band featuring John Porcelly

Albums
 Never Surrender (album) or the title song, by Triumph, 1982
 Never Surrender, or the title song, by Blitz, 2005
 Never Surrender, by Darker Half, 2014

Songs
 "Never Surrender" (2 Unlimited song), 1998
 "Never Surrender" (Corey Hart song), 1985
 "Never Surrender", by Combichrist from Making Monsters
 "Never Surrender", by DJ Khaled from Suffering from Success
 "Never Surrender", by Don Felder from Airborne
 "Never Surrender", by Nana Mizuki
 "Never Surrender", by Saxon from Denim and Leather
 "Never Surrender", by Skillet from Awake
 "Never Surrender", by Stan Bush

See also
 "We shall never surrender", a quotation from Winston Churchill's We shall fight on the beaches speech
 No Surrender (disambiguation)